The men's 100 metres at the 2007 Asian Winter Games was held on 29 and 31 January 2007 in Changchun, China.

Schedule
All times are China Standard Time (UTC+08:00)

Records

Results
Legend
DSQ — Disqualified

Preliminary

Semifinals

Heat 1

Heat 2

Heat 3

Finals

Final C

Final B

Final A

References
Results

External links
Official website

Men 100